Adam Carter Sioui (born May 10, 1982) is a former competition swimmer who represented Canada in international events.  He was a butterfly and freestyle specialist and was the Canadian national record-holder in the 200-metre butterfly.

Early years 

Sioui was born in Trenton, Ontario, Canada.

U.S. college career 

Sioui attended the University of Florida in Gainesville, Florida, where he swam for coach Gregg Troy's Florida Gators swimming and diving team in National Collegiate Athletic Association (NCAA) competition from 2002 to 2005.  During his four-year college career, he received nineteen All-American honours and was the NCAA national champion in the 200-yard freestyle in 2002.

International career 

At 2007 Canadian National Championships, he won gold in the 100-metre freestyle, 100-metre butterfly and 200-metre butterfly.  He competed in the 2008 Summer Olympics in 100-metre and 200-metre butterfly and his Canadian team finished fifth in the 4x200-metre freestyle relay. He received a National Aboriginal Achievement Award, now known as the Indspire Awards in 2009.

See also 

 List of University of Florida alumni
 List of University of Florida Olympians

References

External links 
 
 
 

1982 births
Living people
Canadian male butterfly swimmers
Canadian male freestyle swimmers
Canadian people of Algerian descent
Florida Gators men's swimmers
Olympic swimmers of Canada
People from Quinte West
Sportspeople from Ontario
Swimmers at the 2007 Pan American Games
Swimmers at the 2008 Summer Olympics
Medalists at the FINA World Swimming Championships (25 m)
Pan American Games bronze medalists for Canada
Indspire Awards
First Nations sportspeople
Pan American Games medalists in swimming
Medalists at the 2007 Pan American Games